Calreticulin also known as  calregulin, CRP55, CaBP3, calsequestrin-like protein, and endoplasmic reticulum resident protein 60 (ERp60) is a protein that in humans is encoded by the CALR gene.

Calreticulin is a multifunctional soluble protein that binds Ca2+ ions (a second messenger in signal transduction), rendering it inactive. The Ca2+ is bound with low affinity, but high capacity, and can be released on a signal (see inositol trisphosphate). Calreticulin is located in storage compartments associated with the endoplasmic reticulum and is considered an ER resident protein.

The term "Mobilferrin" is considered to be the same as calreticulin by some sources.

Function 

Calreticulin binds to misfolded proteins and prevents them from being exported from the endoplasmic reticulum to the Golgi apparatus.

A similar quality-control molecular chaperone, calnexin, performs the same service for soluble proteins as does calreticulin, however it is a membrane-bound protein.  Both proteins, calnexin and calreticulin, have the function of binding to oligosaccharides containing terminal glucose residues, thereby targeting them for degradation.  Calreticulin and Calnexin's ability to bind carbohydrates associates them with the lectin protein family.  In normal cellular function, trimming of glucose residues off the core oligosaccharide added during N-linked glycosylation is a part of protein processing.  If "overseer" enzymes note that residues are misfolded, proteins within the rER will re-add glucose residues so that other calreticulin/calnexin can bind to these proteins and prevent them from proceeding to the Golgi.  This leads these aberrantly folded proteins down a path whereby they are targeted for degradation.

Studies on transgenic mice reveal that calreticulin is a cardiac embryonic gene that is essential during development.

Calreticulin and calnexin are also integral proteins in the production of MHC class I Proteins. As newly synthesized MHC class I α-chains enter the endoplasmic reticulum, calnexin binds on to them retaining them in a partly folded state. After the β2-microglobulin binds to the peptide-loading complex (PLC), calreticulin (along with ERp57) takes over the job of chaperoning the MHC class I protein while the tapasin links the complex to the transporter associated with antigen processing (TAP) complex. This association prepares the MHC class I for binding an antigen for presentation on the cell surface.

Transcription regulation 

Calreticulin is also found in the nucleus, suggesting that it may have a role in transcription regulation. Calreticulin binds to the synthetic peptide KLGFFKR, which is almost identical to an amino acid sequence in the DNA-binding domain of the superfamily of nuclear receptors. The amino terminus of calreticulin interacts with the DNA-binding domain of the glucocorticoid receptor and prevents the receptor from binding to its specific glucocorticoid response element. Calreticulin can inhibit the binding of androgen receptor to its hormone-responsive DNA element and can inhibit androgen receptor and retinoic acid receptor transcriptional activities in vivo, as well as retinoic acid-induced neuronal differentiation. Thus, calreticulin can act as an important modulator of the regulation of gene transcription by nuclear hormone receptors.

Clinical significance 

Calreticulin binds to antibodies in certain area of systemic lupus and Sjögren patients that contain anti-Ro/SSA antibodies. Systemic lupus erythematosus is associated with increased autoantibody titers against calreticulin, but calreticulin is not a Ro/SS-A antigen. Earlier papers referred to calreticulin as an Ro/SS-A antigen, but this was later disproven. Increased autoantibody titer against human calreticulin is found in infants with complete congenital heart block of both the IgG and IgM classes.

In 2013, two groups detected calreticulin mutations in a majority of JAK2-negative/MPL-negative patients with essential thrombocythemia and primary myelofibrosis, which makes CALR mutations the second most common in myeloproliferative neoplasms. All mutations (insertions or deletions) affected the last exon, generating a reading frame shift of the resulting protein, that creates a novel terminal peptide and causes a loss of endoplasmic reticulum KDEL retention signal.

Role in cancer 

Calreticulin (CRT) is expressed in many cancer cells and plays a role to promote macrophages to engulf hazardous cancerous cells. The reason why most of the cells are not destroyed is the presence of another molecule with signal CD47, which blocks CRT.  Hence antibodies that block CD47 might be useful as a cancer treatment. In mice models of myeloid leukemia and non-Hodgkin lymphoma, anti-CD47 were effective in clearing cancer cells while normal cells were unaffected.

Interactions 

Calreticulin has been shown to interact with Perforin and NK2 homeobox 1.

References

Further reading

External links 
 

C-type lectins
Immune system
Transcription coregulators
Molecular chaperones